The 2019 Real Monarchs season is the fifth season for Real Monarchs in the United Soccer League Championship, the second-tier professional soccer league in the United States and Canada.

Club

As of February 20, 2019

Competitions

Exhibitions

USL Championship

Standings

Match results

On December 19, 2018, the USL announced that their 2019 season schedule.

Unless otherwise noted, all times in MDT (UTC-06)

USL Cup Playoffs

U.S. Open Cup 

Due to being owned by a higher division professional club (Real Salt Lake), Real Monarchs is one of 13 teams expressly forbidden from entering the Cup competition.

References

2019
Real Monarchs
Real Monarchs
Real Monarchs